is a Japanese footballer currently playing as a midfielder for Tochigi SC.

Career statistics

Club
.

Notes

References

1999 births
Living people
Association football people from Tokyo
Nihon University alumni
Japanese footballers
Association football midfielders
J2 League players
Tokyo Verdy players
Tochigi SC players